The Alaska Baseball League (ABL) is an amateur collegiate summer baseball league.  Players in the league must have attended one year of college and must have one year of NCAA eligibility remaining.

The Midnight Sun Game, held at Growden Memorial Park in Fairbanks on the longest day of each year, is one of the highlights of the Alaska Baseball League season.

In the past, the ABL has sent its top teams to compete at the National Baseball Congress (NBC) World Series, where the league's representatives have won multiple championships.  Anchorage has won in 1969, 1971, 1986, 1991, and 2001, Fairbanks in 1972, 1973, 1974, 1976, 1980, and 2002, Kenai in 1977, 1993, and 1994, and Matsu in 1987 and 1997.  League teams have also finished second in several years.

Current teams
Anchorage Bucs – Mulcahy Stadium, Anchorage
Anchorage Glacier Pilots – Mulcahy Stadium, Anchorage
Chugiak-Eagle River Chinooks – Loretta French Park, Chugiak (Note: they were previously the Athletes in Action Fire)
Mat-Su Miners – Hermon Brothers Field, Palmer
Peninsula Oilers – Coral Seymour Memorial Ballpark, Kenai

Former teams 
North Pole Nicks 1980–1987
Palouse Empire Cougars 1986–1991 
Hawaii Island Movers 1986–2001 
San Francisco Senators 1988
Athletes in Action Fire 2001–2011 
Valley Green Giants 1976–1979 
Cook Inlet Bucs 1980–1983 
Alaska Goldpanners 1974–2010; 2012–2015

Past league champions

2022: Anchorage Glacier Pilots
2021: Anchorage Glacier Pilots
2020: League Not Held
2019: Anchorage Bucs
2018: Mat-Su Miners
2017: Mat-Su Miners
2016: Mat-Su Miners
2015: Anchorage Bucs
2014: Fairbanks Goldpanners
2013: Fairbanks Goldpanners
2012: Anchorage Glacier Pilots
2011: Peninsula Oilers
2010: Mat-Su Miners
2009: Mat-Su Miners
2008: Anchorage Glacier Pilots
2007: Fairbanks AIA Fire
2006: Peninsula Oilers
2005: Fairbanks Goldpanners
2004: Mat-Su Miners
2003: Fairbanks Goldpanners
2002: Fairbanks Goldpanners
2000: Peninsula Oilers
1998: Anchorage Bucs/Peninsula Oilers (tie)
1996: Anchorage Bucs
1994: Fairbanks Goldpanners
1993: Anchorage Bucs
1992: Anchorage Bucs
1991: Anchorage Bucs
1990: Anchorage Bucs

Notable alumni

Bruce Bochte
Barry Bonds
Aaron Boone
Jason Castro
Chris Chambliss
Jesse Chavez
Warren Cromartie
Josh Donaldson
JD Drew
Jacoby Ellsbury
Jeff Francis
David Fletcher
Jason Giambi
Paul Goldschmidt
Luis Gonzalez
Mark Grace
Brian Horwitz
Randy Johnson
Wally Joyner
Aaron Judge
Eric Karros
Jeff Kent
Jed Lowrie
Mark McGwire
Kris Medlen
Doug Mientkiewicz
Eli Morgan (born 1996)
John Olerud
James Paxton
Mike Pereira
Stephen Piscotty
Tyson Ross
Brendan Ryan
Tom Seaver
JT Snow
Dave Stieb
Kurt Suzuki
Danny Valencia
Frank Viola
Jered Weaver
C. J. Wilson
Dave Winfield

References

External links
Alaska Baseball League official website
49th State Hardball (ABL fan blog)

 
Baseball in Alaska
College baseball leagues in the United States
Summer baseball leagues
Defunct baseball teams in Alaska
Baseball teams in Alaska
Baseball leagues in Alaska